William Harold Robertson (25 March 1923 – 15 March 2003) was an English former professional footballer who played in the Football League for Chelsea, Birmingham City and Stoke City. He played as a goalkeeper.

Career
Robertson was born in Crowthorne, Berkshire. In youth football he played as a centre forward, only switching to goalkeeping while in the Royal Air Force stationed at Lossiemouth during the Second World War. He signed for Chelsea in October 1945, and played 43 times in all competitions for the first team before moving to Birmingham City in December 1948. This move failed to improve matters, as Robertson found himself behind Gil Merrick in the pecking order and played just three times in a three-and-a-half years.

He became new Stoke City manager Frank Taylor's first signing in the summer of 1952 as he saw him as a replacement for the ageing Dennis Herod. He had an awful first season with the club breaking his leg against Manchester City on 20 December 1952 after 19 matches during which time he had conceded 38 goals and the 1952–53 season ended with relegation to the Second Division. He recovered from his injury and became first choice 'keeper under Taylor as Stoke failed to gain a return to the top-flight, narrowly missed out in 1954–55, 1956–57 and 1958–59 finishing 5th three times. Stoke had an awful 1959–60 campaign which saw Taylor sacked by the board and new manager Tony Waddington signed Everton's Jimmy O'Neill and Robertson decided to retire.

After retirement from football he kept a newsagents' in Bucknell, Shropshire, before returning to the south of England in 1963. He moved to Hanworth, Middlesex, where he again kept a newsagents' shop until his retirement.

Career statistics
Source:

References

External links
 

1923 births
2003 deaths
People from Crowthorne
English footballers
Association football goalkeepers
Chelsea F.C. players
Birmingham City F.C. players
Stoke City F.C. players
English Football League players
Royal Air Force personnel of World War II
Royal Air Force airmen
Military personnel from Berkshire